The Parti de la démocratie socialiste (PDS) was a provincial political party in Quebec, Canada.

Founded as the New Democratic Party of Quebec [Nouveau Parti Démocratique du Québec (NPDQ)], the NPDQ was originally affiliated with the federal New Democratic Party (NDP) but separated from the NDP in 1989 before disaffiliating entirely in 1991. A new section of the federal NDP, called New Democratic Party of Canada – Québec Section was refounded in 1990, and is active only in federal politics.

History
The PDS' roots can be traced to 1939, with the founding of the Fédération du Commonwealth Coopératif (FCC), later renamed Parti social démocratique du Québec (PSD) in 1955.  The FCC/PSD was the Quebec counterpart of Canada's federal Co-operative Commonwealth Federation (CCF) party.

After the CCF became the New Democratic Party (NDP) in 1961, the NPDQ was created in 1963 following the concerted efforts of the Quebec Federation of Labour (Fédération des travailleurs du Québec) (FTQ) and of the Quebec section of the Co-operative Commonwealth Federation (CCF), which had been known as the Parti social démocratique du Québec (PSD) since 1955.

On the federal level, in its role as the Quebec section of the NDP, the NPDQ contested the Canadian federal elections between 1962 and 1988.

Until the end of the 1960s, in conformity with the division of roles that had been decided in 1963, the NPDQ was active exclusively on the federal political level in Quebec. This left the provincial political level to the pro-independence Parti socialiste du Québec, PSQ) led by former PSD leader Michel Chartrand. After the disappearance of the PSQ around 1968, the NPDQ continued to concentrate most of its attention on the federal level during the 1970s and the early 1980s. It made a few incursions on the provincial level, running a few candidates, first in the Quebec general election of 1970, and later in the general election of 1976, the second time as part of a coalition with the Regroupement des militants syndicaux (RMS).

The provincial party became defunct following leader Henri-François Gautrin's resignation in 1979.

In the mid-1980s, the federal NDP's Quebec section determined that there was a new political vacuum in Quebec politics and that, in addition to its role in federal politics, the time had come for the NPDQ to return to the provincial scene. The NPDQ registered as a political party in Quebec in 1985 and selected Jean-Paul Harney as leader. It ran in the general elections in 1985, 1989 and 1994.

In 1989, the NPDQ voted to disaffiliate from the federal NDP as a result of policy differences, such as the provincial party's opposition to the Meech Lake Accord; its support for Quebec's language policy; differences with the federal party over the Canada – United States Free Trade Agreement; and its more favourable position towards Quebec nationalism.  As a result, the NPDQ concentrated its activities on the Quebec provincial political level, and its members became free to adhere to any federal political party. Similarly, the federal NDP directed its activities in Quebec exclusively on the federal political level, through its Quebec branch renamed the New Democratic Party of Canada (Quebec Section), which runs candidates only in federal elections and whose members became free to adhere to any provincial political party in Quebec. Practically, this brought the situation back to what it had been between 1963 and 1968, but with the difference that the NPDQ, which after the first division of 1963 had ended up being an organization centred on federal politics, now ended up being an organization centred on provincial politics after the second division of 1989. During this time, the party came under the influence of sovereigntists.

Tensions between the provincial and federal parties came to a head in 1990 when the NPDQ announced its support for Gilles Duceppe's candidacy as a Bloc Québécois candidate in a federal by-election and urged federal NDP candidate Louise O'Neill to withdraw from the contest so as not to split the vote. As a result, the federal party voted to sever its "fraternal ties" to its former provincial wing and the provincial party was encouraged to change its name. The federal NDP denounced the provincial party when it nominated former Front de libération du Québec member Paul Rose as a candidate in a provincial by-election. Rose had been convicted for his role in the murder of Pierre Laporte during the 1970 October Crisis. The federal NDP announced that they were seeking legal means to force the NPDQ to stop calling using the name "New Democratic".

After the general election of 1994, the NPDQ decided to change its name to Parti de la Democratie Socialiste (PDS). Rose was elected its leader two years later. Under this new name, the PDS contested the general election of 1998.

In 2002, the PDS became a part of the left-wing coalition Union des forces progressistes (UFP; Union of Progressive Forces), together with the Rassemblement pour l'alternative progressiste (RAP; Union for a Progressive Alternative) and the Communist Party of Quebec.  As a consequence, the PDS withdrew its official party registration with the chief electoral officer and participated under the UFP banner in the Quebec general election of 2003. In 2006, the UFP merged with Option citoyenne to form Québec solidaire. It remains an organized tendency within the new coalition under the name "Québec socialiste".

Québec solidaire contested the 2007 general election and won its first seat in the National Assembly in 2008.

In 2014, supporters of the federal NDP founded a new New Democratic Party of Quebec (NPDQ) which intends to stand candidates in the 2018 provincial election.

Electoral results (Quebec general elections)

Leaders of the NPD-Québec/Parti de la Democratie Socialiste

NPDQ

 Robert Cliche (1964–1968)
 Roland Morin (1970–1973)
 Henri-François Gautrin (1973–1979)
 none (party not active)
 Jean-Paul Harney (1985–1988)
 Roland Morin (1987–1989)
 Gaétan Nadeau (1989–1990)
 Michel Parenteau (1990–1992)
 Jean-François Sirois (1992–1994)

PDS (not affiliated with NDP)

 Jocelyne Dupuis (1994–1996)
 Paul Rose (1996–2002)
 none (PDS merged into the UFP)

See also

 List of Quebec general elections
 List of Quebec leaders of the Opposition
 List of Quebec premiers
 National Assembly of Quebec
 Political parties in Quebec
 Politics of Quebec
 Timeline of Quebec history

References

External links
 National Assembly historical information
 La Politique québécoise sur le Web

Defunct provincial political parties in Quebec
1963 establishments in Quebec
2002 disestablishments in Quebec
Democratic socialist parties in North America
Political parties established in 1963
Political parties disestablished in 2002
New Democratic Party of Quebec